Regional parks of New Zealand are protected areas administered by regional councils, the top tier of local government.

Auckland Region

There are 31 regional parks in the Auckland Region managed by Auckland Council.

They were administered by the Auckland Regional Council until it was replaced with Auckland Council in 2010.

 Ambury Regional Park
 Ātiu Creek Regional Park
 Auckland Botanic Gardens
 Āwhitu Regional Park
 Duder Regional Park
 Glenfern Sanctuary Regional Park
 Hunua Ranges Regional Park
 Long Bay Regional Park
 Mahurangi Regional Park
 Motukorea Browns Island Regional Park
 Muriwai Regional Park
 Mutukaroa / Hamlins Hill Regional Park
 Ōmana Regional Park
 Orere Point Regional Park
 Pākiri Regional Park
 Scandrett Regional Park
 Shakespear Regional Park
 Tāpapakanga Regional Park
 Tāwharanui Regional Park
 Tawhitokino Regional Park
 Te Ārai Regional Park
 Te Rau Pūriri Regional Park
 Waharau Regional Park
 Waitākere Ranges Regional Park
 Waitawa Regional Park
 Wenderholm Regional Park
 Whakanewha Regional Park
 Whakatīwai Regional Park

Bay of Plenty Region

The regional parks in the Bay of Plenty Region are administered by the Bay of Plenty Regional Council.

 Onekawa Te Mawhai Regional Park
 Papamoa Hills Regional Park

Wellington Region

The regional parks in the Wellington Region are administered by the Greater Wellington Regional Council.

 Akatarawa Forest
 Baring Head/Orua-pouanui
 Battle Hill Farm Forest Park
 Belmont Regional Park
 East Harbour Regional Park
 Hutt River Trail
 Hutt Water Collection Area
 Kaitoke Regional Park
 Pakuratahi Forest
 Queen Elizabeth Park
 Te Awarua-o-Porirua Harbour
 Wainuiomata Recreation Area
 Wainuiomata Water Collection Area
 Wairarapa Moana Wetlands
 Wellington Harbour
 Whitireia Park

Canterbury Region

The regional parks in the Canterbury Region are administered by Canterbury Regional Council.

 Ashley Rakahuri Regional Park
 Northern Pegasus Bay
 Lake Tekapo Regional Park
 Waimakariri River Regional Park

See also
 Protected areas of New Zealand
 Conservation in New Zealand
 Forest parks of New Zealand
 National parks of New Zealand

References